David W. Murhammer is Professor and former Department Chair of Chemical and Biochemical Engineering at the University of Iowa, specializing in biochemical engineering. He is also a member of the Center for Biocatalysis and Bioprocessing there.  Dr. Murhammer received his B.S. and M.S. degrees from Oregon State University, and his Ph.D. in Chemical Engineering at the University of Houston in 1989. Professor Murhammer was a grad student under Charles F. Goochee. He then joined the College of Engineering in 1989 as Assistant Professor, becoming Professor in 2003.

Murhammer also worked briefly in the Zirconium refining industry, which sparked his lifelong dedication to chemical process safety.

Research interests and publications
Research interests include baculoviruses, with emphasis on their bioinsecticide production and effects on insect cell cultures.

Murhammer is an editor of Baculovirus and Insect Cell Expression Protocols.  He has also made numerous presentations at government and industrial engineering laboratories and conferences.  He has written a total of 43 journal articles.  Among his major recent peer-reviewed publications are:

Honors and memberships
He is Associate Editor of Applied Biochemistry and Biotechnology, and a member of the American Chemical Society; American Institute of Chemical Engineers; American Society for Engineering Education; Society for Free Radical Biology and Medicine.

He regularly teaches courses in "Process calculations", "Engineering flow/Heat exchange", "Chemical process safety", and "Introduction to biochemical engineering".

External links
University faculty page
official C. V.

Living people
21st-century American chemists
Oregon State University alumni
University of Houston alumni
Year of birth missing (living people)